Kambarangoh is an area along the summit trail to Low's Peak on Mount Kinabalu in Sabah, Borneo. It lies between the Power Station and Layang-Layang.  It is named after the only telecommunications station on the mountain, which is owned by Kambarangoh Telecoms.

The road leading up to the Power Station from Kinabalu Park Headquarters is also called Kambarangoh Road.

Mount Kinabalu
Protected areas of Sabah